In Greek mythology, Asterius is a Giant (usually among the ones who took arms against the gods), the children of the deities Gaia (the Earth) and Uranus (the Sky) who fought and was killed by the goddess Athena.

Name 
Asterius's name translates to 'starry', and thus 'glitterer, bright'. His name is also spelled Aster, and another number of ways (see below). Asterius' name thus shares an etymology with the names of Astraeus, Astraea, and Asteria.

Mythology 
A Giant opponent of Athena is depicted on the Siphnian Treasury, a sixth century BC marble depiction of the Gigantomachy from Delphi, labelled 'Astarias'. Astarias lies dead on the ground near a male figure that has been identified as either Ares or Achilles, as Athena goes on to fight another Giant named Erictypus.

In the epic poem Meropis, the Giant, here spelled as Asterus, is presented as an invulnerable warrior from the Aegean island of Kos, who battles Heracles during his fight against the Meropes, the Koan race of Giants; Athena intervenes to save Heracles from demise and kills Asterus by flaying him. This is paralleled in Apollodorus's account, who wrote that during the fight against the Giants, Athena flayed and killed Pallas, and then used his skin for her aegis. Euripides, in his play Ion also mentions a Giant that Athena flayed during the Gigantomachy and then proceeded to wear his hide, but he names him Gorgon.

Pausanias also tells of Asterius, a son of Anax who was the son of Earth (the goddess Gaia), buried on the island of Asterius, near the Island of Lade, off the coast of Miletus, having bones ten cubits in length.

Culture 
Asterius's killing by Athena was celebrated by the Athenians during the Panathenaea, a festival in honour of Athena; the Athenians claimed that the early inhabitants had set the festival up following the death of Asterius. The victory of the gods over the Giants was woven on the robe of the Panathenaea, perhaps with special emphasis on Athena's killing of Asterius, or maybe Enceladus.

See also 

 Aristaeus (giant)
 Mimas
 Picolous
 Porphyrion
 Polybotes

References

Bibliography 

 Apollodorus, The Library with an English Translation by Sir James George Frazer, F.B.A., F.R.S. in 2 Volumes, Cambridge, MA, Harvard University Press; London, William Heinemann Ltd. 1921. . Online version at the Perseus Digital Library. Greek text available from the same website.
 
 
 
 
 Euripides, Ion, translated by Robert Potter in The Complete Greek Drama, edited by Whitney J. Oates and Eugene O'Neill, Jr. Volume 1. New York. Random House. 1938.
 
  Online version at Perseus.tufts project.
 
 
 Pausanias, Pausanias Description of Greece with an English Translation by W.H.S. Jones, Litt.D., and H.A. Ormerod, M.A., in 4 Volumes. Cambridge, Massachusetts, Harvard University Press; London, William Heinemann Ltd. 1918. Online version at the Perseus Digital Library.
 
 
 

Children of Gaia
Gigantes
Deeds of Athena
Mythology of Heracles
People executed by flaying
Anatolian characters in Greek mythology
Kos
Aegean Sea in mythology